Sullivan is an unincorporated community in Raleigh County, West Virginia, United States. The Sullivan post office  has been closed.

References

Unincorporated communities in Raleigh County, West Virginia
Unincorporated communities in West Virginia
Coal towns in West Virginia